The Marrucini were an Italic tribe that occupied a small strip of territory around the ancient Teate (modern Chieti), on the east coast of Abruzzo, Italy, limited by the Aterno and Foro Rivers. Other Marrucinian centers included Ceio (San Valentino in Abruzzo Citeriore), Iterpromium (whose ruins are under the Abbey of San Clemente at Casauria), Civitas Danzica (Rapino), and the port of Aternum (Pescara), shared with the Vestini.

History
The tribe is first mentioned in history as a member of a confederacy with which the Romans came into conflict in the second Samnite War, 325 BC, and it entered the Roman Alliance as a separate unit at the end of that war (see further Paeligni).

Language

A few inscriptions in the Marrucinian language survive. They indicate that the language was a member of the Sabellian group, probably closely related to Paelignian. Most of the inscriptions are very short, but there is one longer inscription, a bronze tablet inscribed with a text of 35 words. This was found at Rapino, and known as the "Aes Rapinum" ("Bronze of Rapino"). It is dated to about the middle of the 3rd century BC. It was formerly in the Museum of Antiquities in Berlin, but appears to have been lost during the Second World War. The opening of the Aes Rapinum reads .

The name of the city or tribe that it gives is touta marouca, and it mentions also a citadel with the epithet tarin cris. Several of its linguistic features, both in vocabulary and in syntax, are of considerable interest to the student of Latin or Italic grammar (e.g. the use of the subjunctive, without any conjunction, to express purpose, a clause prescribing a sacrifice to Ceres being followed immediately by pacrsi eituam amatens).

The form of the name is of interest, as it shows the suffix -NO- superimposed on the suffix -CO-, a change that probably indicates some conquest of an earlier tribe by the invading Safins (or Sabini).

Gentes of Marrucini origin 

 Asinia gens

References

 This work in turn cites:

Ancient Italic peoples
Socii
Ancient Abruzzo
Osco-Umbrian languages